Lorenzo Berardinetti (born 21 October 1961) is a former politician in Ontario, Canada. He was a Liberal member of the Legislative Assembly of Ontario from 2003 to 2018 who represented the Toronto riding of Scarborough Southwest.

Background
Berardinetti was born and raised in Scarborough, and is a lawyer.  He attended the University of Toronto and the University of Windsor Law School, and was called to the Ontario Bar in 1988. On October 25, 2010, Berardinetti's then-wife Michelle won election as a Toronto City Councillor.

Politics

Municipal
Berardinetti was a councillor in  the pre-amalgamation Scarborough Council from 1988 to 1996, and represented Ward 37 (Scarborough Centre) on the amalgamated Toronto City Council from 1997 to 2003. In 1997, he served as chair of Toronto's administration committee, which created the framework for a unified civic administration in the amalgamated city.  Berardinetti was generally regarded as an ally of Toronto mayor Mel Lastman during his years on the Toronto council.

Provincial
In the provincial election of 2003, Berardinetti defeated incumbent Progressive Conservative Dan Newman by about 6,000 votes in Scarborough Southwest.  The Liberals won a majority government under Dalton McGuinty in this election, and Berardinetti was appointed the deputy government whip on 23 October 2003. He was re-elected in 2007, 2011, and 2014.

In 2004, he introduced a private member's bill, to outlaw what he called "gender-based pricing," whereby prices for equivalent or similar products and services, such as clothing, dry cleaning and haircuts, may vary between women and men.  He contended women were charged much more for many products and services. The bill reached only second reading before it died on the order paper.

During his time in the government, Berardinetti was a Parliamentary Assistant to the Minister of Labour (2010-2011) and PA to the Attorney General (2011–2018).

Berardinetti lost his seat in the 2018 provincial election, finishing third in the riding of Scarborough Southwest.

In 2022, Berardinetti attempted to return to city politics, running for a seat on Toronto city council in the riding of Scarborough Southwest.  He finished fourth in the election.

Election results

References

External links

1961 births
21st-century Canadian politicians
Canadian politicians of Italian descent
Living people
Ontario Liberal Party MPPs
People from Scarborough, Toronto
Toronto city councillors
University of Toronto alumni
University of Windsor alumni
University of Windsor Faculty of Law alumni